Neoglyphidodon bonang is a species of damselfish in the family Pomacentridae. It is native to the Indo-Pacific. This fish is omnivorous. It is found in the aquarium trade.

Distribution and habitat
This species of damselfish is native to the Indo-Pacific. In the Indian Ocean, they are found from Sri Lanka, Indonesia around Sumatra and Java and, Australia. In the Pacific Ocean, its range extends from Sulawesi in Indonesia to the Solomon Islands. They inhabit coral reefs.

Description
They have 13 dorsal spines, 15 to 16 dorsal soft rays, 2 anal spines, and 13 to 15 dorsal soft rays. Like most species of the genus Neoglyphidodon, juveniles and adults of this species have different colouration. Adults are black. Juveniles are orange or yellow with a black spot around their dorsal fin. Around that black spot, it has a blue circle around it. There is usually a blue pattern of lines that extends from its eye towards the black spot.

Ecology

Diet
This fish is omnivorous.

Behaviour

In the aquarium
This fish is found in the aquarium trade.

Reproduction
Females lay their eggs on the bottom of the seafloor. The males guard and aerate the eggs until they hatch.

References

bonang
Fish described in 1852